The Newfoundland red crossbill is a member of the crossbill genus which has its crossed bill adapted for prying open the tightly closed spruce or pine cones in order to extract the seeds found abundantly on the island of Newfoundland.

It was thought to be fully endemic to Newfoundland, but breeding has been found on Anticosti island in the Gulf of Saint Lawrence, administratively part of Quebec.

It is known locally as the spruce mope. About 5.5 to 6.5 inches in length, wing about 3.75 inches and its bill .70 inches. The adult male is a dull red which is somewhat brighter on the rump, with wings and tail black in color. The adult female is an olive-gray with yellow on the rump and often on the under parts, the wings and tail a dark grayish. Juveniles vary in color from olive-green to yellow to reddish.

They nest in conifers building their nest from twigs or strips of bark and lining it with mosses, hair or fur. They lay 4 to 5 eggs which are greenish-blue, spotted with brown and lavender.

The local name refers to their slow movements while feeding in the spruce tops. They can be seen in mixed company with the slightly larger white-winged crossbill.

The taxonomy of the bird has been questioned.

References

External links
 North American Distribution
 Coevolution to patterns of crossbill (Loxia) diversity in the northern boreal forests

Loxia
Native birds of Eastern Canada
Birds described in 1834
Endemic fauna of Canada